Coyne may refer to:

Coyne (surname), a surname of Irish origin
Coyne and livery, in Gaelic Ireland the free entertainment which a chief exacted from his subjects for his servants and followers
Coyne, Churchtown, a townland in Churchtown civil parish, barony of Rathconrath, County Westmeath, Ireland
Coyne College, an American for-profit college
Coyne et Bellier, French consulting and engineering firm
14429 Coyne, a main-belt asteroid

See also
 Coin (disambiguation)